The Minister for Children, Equality, Disability, Integration and Youth is a senior minister in the Government of Ireland and leads the Department of Children, Equality, Disability, Integration and Youth.

The current Minister for Children, Equality, Disability, Integration and Youth is Roderic O'Gorman, TD.

He is assisted by two Ministers of State:
Anne Rabbitte, TD – Minister of State for Disability
Joe O'Brien, TD – Minister of State for Integration

Overview
The department was created in 1956 as the Department of the Gaeltacht. Its title and functions have changed several times, with the current title adopted in 2020. An office of Minister of State for Children existed from 1994 to 2011. The Minister for Tourism, Culture, Arts, Gaeltacht, Sport and Media is currently responsible for the Gaeltacht.

List of office-holders

References

External links
Department of Children, Equality, Disability, Integration and Youth

Government ministers of the Republic of Ireland
Lists of government ministers of Ireland
Ministers for children, young people and families
Minister